The Women's South American Volleyball Championship is the official competition for senior women's national volleyball teams of South America, organized by the Confederación Sudamericana de Voleibol (CSV). The initial gap between championships was variable, but since 1967 they have been awarded every two years. The competition has been dominated by Brazil and Peru.

History

Medals summary

MVP by edition

1951 - Unknown
1956 - Unknown
1958 - Unknown
1961 - Unknown
1962 - Unknown
1964 - 
1967 - 
1969 - Unknown
1971 - Unknown
1973 - Unknown
1975 - Unknown
1977 - Unknown
1979 - Unknown
1981 - 
1983 - 
1985 - Unknown
1987 - 
1989 - 
1991 - 
1993 - 
1995 - 
1997 - 
1999 - Unknown
2001 - 
2003 - Unknown
2005 - 
2007 - 
2009 - 
2011 - 
2013 - 
2015 - 
2017 - 
2019 - 
2021 -

See also

 South American Men's Volleyball Championship
 Women's U22 South American Volleyball Championship
 Women's Junior South American Volleyball Championship
 Girls' Youth South American Volleyball Championship
 Girls' U16 South American Volleyball Championship
 Volleyball at the Pan American Games
 Men's Pan-American Volleyball Cup
 Women's Pan-American Volleyball Cup

References

External links
Official website
Confederación Sudamericana de Voleibol – Historical Ranking

 
 
V
Volleyball competitions in South America
International volleyball competitions
International women's volleyball competitions
South American championships
Biennial sporting events
1951 establishments in South America